Elisabeth Jenny Nyborg (April 15, 1887 – September 10, 1976) was a Norwegian actress.

Nyborg had her film debut in 1932 in Rasmus Breistein's comedy Skjærgårdsflirt. She appeared in five films altogether from 1932 to 1941. Nyborg was also engaged with the Oslo New Theater as an actress and prompter.

Filmography
1914: Fredriksen Fald as a switchboard operator
1932: Skjærgårdsflirt as Augusta Østerholm
1934: Liv as a farmwife
1939: De vergeløse as Myrbråten's wife
1941: Gullfjellet as Berte Kanten
1943: Vigdis as a farmer's wife

References

External links
 
 Lisbeth Nyborg at Sceneweb

1887 births
1976 deaths
Norwegian stage actresses
Norwegian film actresses
20th-century Norwegian actresses